Boxing at the 2015 Pacific Games was held on 14–18 July 2015 at Port Moresby in Papua New Guinea.

Medal summary

Medal table

Men’s results

Women's results

See also
 Boxing at the Pacific Games

References

2015
2015 Pacific Games
Pacific Games